The Inspiration Lake, officially known as The Inspiration Lake Recreation Centre, is a 12-hectare artificial lake located in Penny's Bay, Lantau Island, New Territories, Hong Kong. The lake, opened on 16 August 2005, was created as part of the development of adjacent Hong Kong Disneyland Resort as a dual-purpose project for recreation and an irrigation reservoir.

Inspiration Lake was built by the Hong Kong Government and managed by the Hong Kong International Theme Parks. It opens daily from 09:00 - 19:00; entrance is free.

Facilities
The entire Recreation Centre has a total area of about 30-hectares, and consists of the 12-hectare lake — the largest artificial lake in Hong Kong, a boat centre, arboretum, 1,500 m jogging trail with exercise areas and a children's playground. The lake has a depth of between 6.5 and 7.5m, and features waterfall cascades and water fountains/jets capable of shooting up to 18 m in height; and decorated with natural and man-made boulders plus some 4,800 trees and 430,000 shrubs. Facilities on site include changing rooms, toilets, seating areas, and a convenience store which also serves as a paddle boat and surrey bike renting center. There is also a children's play area near the boat and bike renting center.

The artificial lake of 12 hectares features water cascade, water jets, and aquatic plants.

The water jet at the lake with an illumination design can shoot water up to 18 m high. Apart from its recreational purpose, the lake water is a source of irrigation for the entire Penny's Bay.

Along a 1500 m jogging trail emanating from the boat renting center and extending around the lake, there are fitness stations, gazebos and a bridge overlooking a small, picturesque waterfall.

Transport
The lake is approximately 15 minutes walking distance from Disneyland Resort MTR station and the Disneyland Resort Public Transport Interchange. It is served by the following franchised bus route, jointly operated by Citybus and Long Win Bus Company:

R8 Disneyland - Lantau Link Toll Plaza (via Inspiration Lake) (from 09:00 to 19:00 daily)

Parking is available at HK$50 per hour for private cars. (as of Apr 2022)

References

External links

Inspiration Lake information and link to map 
Hong Kong Disneyland Official Website - Inspiration Lake

Penny's Bay
Hong Kong Disneyland Resort
Lakes of Hong Kong
Artificial lakes